Iglica gratulabunda is a species of very small freshwater snail with a gill and an operculum, an aquatic gastropod mollusk in the family Hydrobiidae. This species is endemic to Austria. It is probably found in subterranean freshwater habitat, but is known only from floodline debris.

References

Iglica (gastropod)
Endemic fauna of Austria
Gastropods described in 1910
Taxonomy articles created by Polbot